Anna Maria Jarvis (May 1, 1864 – November 24, 1948) was the founder of Mother's Day in the United States. Her mother had frequently expressed a desire for the establishment of such a holiday, and after her mother's death, Jarvis led the movement for the commemoration. However, as the years passed, Jarvis grew disenchanted with the growing commercialization of the observation (she herself did not profit from the day) and even attempted to have Mother's Day rescinded. She died in a sanitarium, her medical bills paid by people in the floral and greeting card industries.

Family and early life
Anna Maria Jarvis was born to Granville E. and Ann Maria (née Reeves) Jarvis on May 1, 1864, in Webster, Taylor County, West Virginia, the ninth of eleven children. Seven of her siblings died in infancy or early childhood. Her birthplace, today known as the Anna Jarvis House, has been listed on the National Register of Historic Places since 1979. The family moved to Grafton, West Virginia, also in Taylor County, later in her childhood.

Ann Reeves Jarvis was a social activist, founder of Mothers’ Day Work Clubs. As a woman defined by her faith, she was very active within the Andrews Methodist Episcopal Church community. It was during one of her Sunday school lessons in 1876 that her daughter, Anna Jarvis, allegedly found her inspiration for Mother's Day, as Ann closed her lesson with a prayer, stating:

At the encouragement of her mother, Anna Jarvis attended college and was awarded a diploma for the completion of two years of course work at the Augusta Female Seminary in Staunton, Virginia, today known as Mary Baldwin University. Jarvis returned to Grafton to work in the public school system, additionally joining her mother as an active church member, maintaining a close link to her mother.

After her uncle, Dr. James Edmund Reeves, persuaded her to move to Chattanooga, Tennessee, Jarvis worked there as a bank teller for a year. The following year, Jarvis again moved, this time to live with her brother in Philadelphia, Pennsylvania, in spite of her mother's urging to return to Grafton. Jarvis was successful in Philadelphia, taking a position at Fidelity Mutual Life Insurance Company, where she became the agency's first female literary and advertising editor. Another accomplishment was becoming a shareholder in the Quaker City Cab Company, her brother's business.

Even while she was away from Grafton, Anna Jarvis maintained a close correspondence with her mother. Ann Reeves Jarvis was proud of her daughter's achievements and the letters themselves served to keep mother and daughter closely linked. After the death of Jarvis’ father, Granville, in 1902, she urged her mother to move to Philadelphia to stay with her and her brother. Both brother and sister worried about their mother's health and Ann Reeves Jarvis ultimately agreed to move to Philadelphia in 1904 when her heart problems necessitated it. Jarvis spent the majority of her time taking care of her mother as Ann Reeves Jarvis' health declined. She died on May 9, 1905.

Movement towards Mother's Day

On May 10, 1908, three years after her mother's death, Jarvis held a memorial ceremony to honor her mother and all mothers at Andrews Methodist Episcopal Church, today the International Mother's Day Shrine, in Grafton, West Virginia, marking the first official observance of Mother's Day. The International Mother's Day Shrine has been a designated National Historic Landmark since October 5, 1992.

Although Jarvis did not attend this service, she sent a telegram that described the significance of the day as well as five hundred white carnations for all who attended the service. As she spoke in Philadelphia at the Wanamaker's Store Auditorium, she moved her audience with the power of her speech.

Commercialization, conflict, and later life
Although the national proclamation represented a public validation of her efforts, Jarvis always believed herself to be the leader of the commemorative day and therefore maintained her established belief in the sentimental significance of the day to honor all mothers and motherhood. Jarvis valued the symbolism of such tangible items as the white carnation emblem, which she described as: 

Jarvis frequently referred to her mother's memory during her efforts to maintain the sentimental heart of the day while also maintaining her own role as the founder of the holiday. In addition to her efforts to maintain her position and recognition as the holiday's founder, Jarvis struggled against forces of commercialization that overwhelmed her original message. Among some of these forces were the confection, floral and greeting card industry. The symbols that she had valued for their sentimentality, such as the white carnation, easily became commodified and commercialized.

By the 1920s, as the floral industry continued increasing prices of white carnations and then introduced red carnations to meet the demand for the flower, Anna Jarvis' original symbols began to become re-appropriated, such as the red carnation representing living mothers and the white carnation honoring deceased mothers. She attempted to counter these commercial forces, creating a badge with a Mother's Day emblem as a less ephemeral alternative to the white carnation. Her negative opinion of these commercial forces was evident in her contemporary commentary:

However, her efforts to hold on to the original meaning of the day led to her own economic hardship. While others profited from the day, Jarvis did not, and she spent the later years of her life with her sister Lillie. In 1943, she began organizing a petition to rescind Mother's Day. However, these efforts were halted when she was placed in the Marshall Square Sanitarium in West Chester, Pennsylvania. People connected with the floral and greeting card industries paid the bills to keep her in the sanitarium.

Jarvis died on November 24, 1948, and was buried next to her mother, sister, and brother at West Laurel Hill Cemetery in Bala Cynwyd, Pennsylvania. Although the Anna M. Jarvis Committee supported her and helped to continue her movement during her declining health, it ultimately disbanded with the assurance that the Jarvis family gravesite would remain under the care of her grandniece who was the only heir to the estate, her  second oldest brother's granddaughter, as she herself never married or had any children.

See also

 International Mother's Day Shrine

References

Citations

Works cited

Further reading
  How Jarvis fought the commercialization of the holiday.
 Kendall, Norman F. (1937), Mothers Day, A History of its Founding and its Founder
 ''

External links
 Anna Jarvis and Mother's Day
Anna Jarvis, the Germanna Descendant who Founded Mother's Day
 Anna Jarvis and International Mother's Day

 Anna Prior Jarvis diary and autobiography, MSS SC 2697, transcription here; L. Tom Perry Special Collections, Harold B. Lee Library, Brigham Young University

1864 births
1948 deaths
People from Taylor County, West Virginia
Mary Baldwin University alumni
Burials at West Laurel Hill Cemetery